Majungaichthys is a genus of viviparous brotulas native to the western Indian Ocean. The generic name refers to Majunga in Madagascar where the type was collected.

Species
There are currently two recognized species in this genus:
 Majungaichthys agalegae Schwarzhans & Møller, 2011
 Majungaichthys simplex Schwarzhans & Møller, 2007

References

Bythitidae